Groove Phi Groove Social Fellowship, Inc. (GΦG) is a social fellowship. It was founded at Morgan State College (now known as Morgan State University) as an alternative to mainstream historically black fraternities.

History
Groove Phi Groove was founded on October 12, 1962, by a group of young black men who wanted to create an alternative to what was described as the traditionalism of subjectively ascribed established fraternal organizations.

Symbols
Colors - Black - indicating the Race and White indicating Purity.
The seven symbols on the shield
Sword - Courage
Shield - Endurance
Book - Knowledge among College Men
Mug - Fellowship
Chain - Unification of their brotherhood
Torch - Everlasting Light
Fourteen Pearls - founding members of the organization

Governing structure

As a body, the governing structure of the Fellowship consists of The Conclave, the Board of Directors, regional offices, and local chapters.

International headquarters
The international headquarters of Groove Phi Groove Social Fellowship, Inc. is located at 2453 Maryland Avenue in Baltimore, Maryland. The building was purchased on December 26, 2012, and dedicated July 1, 2013.

Notable members

Public service
Clarence "Tiger" Davis Maryland House of Delegates 1983–2007
Douglas Palmer Former Mayor of Trenton NJ
G. K. Butterfield United States Congressman representing the First Congressional District of North Carolina
 Ralph C. Johnson NC State Representative (Democrat)

Athletics
Donnie Shell Former NFL Player with the Pittsburgh Steelers and College Football and NFL Hall of Fame member
Richard Huntley Former NFL Football player with the Pittsburgh Steelers and Atlanta Falcons
Earl "The Pearl" Monroe Former NBA basketball player and Hall of Fame
Sylvester "Junkyard Dog" Ritter American professional wrestler and professional football player with the Houston Oilers (now the Tennessee Titans). Also, a Sports Hall of Fame member and author of The White Golden Bull
Chet Grimsley First White American Student Athlete from the C.I.A.A and former NFL player for the Tampa Bay Buccaneers.

International Programs
The men of Groove Phi Groove Social Fellowship, Inc. actively support and participate in various programs and projects which aim to serve the communities in which they live. Some of these programs and projects focus on black Americans; however, the Fellowship does not discriminate based on race, color, sex, national origin, or physical impairment. Nor do they provide a financial benefit to individual members of the Fellowship, as Groove Phi Groove is a 501(c)(7) not-for-profit entity, and the Groove Fund is a 501(c)(3) not-for-profit charitable entity.

Additional Sources

References

Morgan State University
Student societies in the United States
Student organizations established in 1962
1962 establishments in Maryland